Fritz Moritz Heichelheim  (May 6, 1901 – April 22, 1968) was a German-born ancient historian, who specialized in ancient economic history, at the University of Gießen and as Professor of Greek and Roman History at the University of Toronto.

Fritz Moritz Heichelheim was the son of a banker, Albert and his wife Bertha ( Simonsfeld). She was murdered by the Nazis in 1942.

Heichelheim was a pupil of the ancient historian Richard Laqueur at Gießen where he took his doctorate in 1925 and his habilitation in 1929. His doctoral thesis was "Foreign Inhabitants of Ptolemaic Empire" while his habilitation thesis was "Economic Fluctuations from the time of Alexander to that of Augustus". He worked between his doctorate and habilitation as a high school teacher.

After lecturing there for nearly four years, he, like his colleague at Gießen, Margarete Bieber, was dismissed in 1933 in accordance with the National Socialists’ "cleansing" of the universities (see Law for the Restoration of the Professional Civil Service). However, in fact he was dismissed a few months earlier because of a defiant lecture on Jews in Roman Palestine and Syria.

Like many German scholars, he was forced to emigrate abroad. He lived for many years without a steady job as a private tutor in Cambridge, England and the receipt of a fellowship from the University of Cambridge. In that year, he married his wife Gerta (née Oppenheimer). In 1938, he published the German version of An Ancient economic history.

With an improvement of the terms of his fellowship, he and his wife decided to have a child who was born in 1939 and named Peter. On the outbreak of the Second World War he volunteered to join the branch of the British Army for noncitizens but was refused because of age. In 1940 Heichelheim was interned by the British as a German alien. Two years later he was hired at as an assistant lecturer at the University of Nottingham. He received British Citizenship immediately following the Second World War. He directed the excavation of a Roman Site at Cross Hill, Nottingham. Also at that time, he tried to make contact with the German universities. In 1948 he went there for a short time as an honorary professor of economic history.

In 1948 he went to Canada as a lecturer at the University of Toronto. He was promoted at first to assistant professor and to associate professor. Finally he was made full professor at the University of Toronto from 1962 to his death. He went briefly to Germany as visiting professor to the Free University of Berlin in 1961. He was elected Fellow of The Royal Society of Canada in 1966.

He was one of the early members of Congregation Habonim Toronto, a liberal synagogue founded by Holocaust survivors and refugees from Central Europe, who arrived in Canada after World War II, and one of the first Holocaust refugee/survivor congregations to develop in Canada.

On April 22, 1968, he died at Toronto.

In spite of the difficulties he had, he published two books and over 600 articles. A History of the Roman People is still in print. This productivity can be explained partially by the fact that since his student days, he slept only four hours at night.

At the University of Cambridge, he began cataloguing the Greek coins in the Fitzwilliam Museum. The results of these labours can be seen in Sylloge Nummorum Graecorum, Vol. 4, Parts 1-6 (London, 1940–65). He also collaborated with E. N. Adler, F. L. Griffith, and J. G. Tait in the publication of The Adler Papyri (London, 1939).

Heichelheim tried to foster closer relations between the Universities of Giessen and Toronto. It was through his initiative that the two institutions embarked on a cooperative project, that of editing and publishing the Greek, Coptic, and certain Latin papyri preserved in the university library at Giessen.

A particularly interesting article was Roman Coins from Iceland from 1952. He theorized that the Roman coins found in Iceland were from Germans at the time of the Roman Empire who travelled to Iceland. A modern discussion is found in Roman Coins in Iceland by David Bjarni Heidarsson on http://skemman.is/stream/get/1946/5084/15120/2/Badbh.pdf. Heichelheim's contribution is discussed on page 20. At the time there was interest not only by scholars, but in the public press including The New York Times.

Literary works 
 Wirtschaftliche Schwanklungen der Zeit von Alexander bis Augustus, Jena 1930 (Economic Fluctuations from the time of Alexander to that of Augustus).
 Die auswärtige Bevölkerung im Ptolemäerreich, Leipzig 1925 (Foreign Inhabitants of Ptolemaic Empire).
 The Adler Papyri, (London, 1939).
 Sylloge Nummorum Graecorum, Vol. 4, Parts 1-6 (London, 1940-65).
 Roman Coins from Iceland, Antiquity 26, pp.43-45.
 An Ancient economic history, 2 vols., Leiden, first edition 1938, second edition 1968.
 A History of the Roman People'' Prentice-Hall, first edition 1962, second edition 1984, third edition 2003.

See also

 List of German Canadians

External links
 

 
Fritz M. Heichelheim archival papers held at the University of Toronto Archives and Records Management Services

20th-century German historians
Canadian male non-fiction writers
Economic historians
Historians of antiquity
Academic staff of the University of Toronto
Academic staff of the University of Giessen
University of Giessen alumni
German emigrants to Canada
Jewish emigrants from Nazi Germany to the United Kingdom
Jewish Canadian writers
People from Giessen
1901 births
1968 deaths
20th-century Canadian historians
German male non-fiction writers
Canadian people of German-Jewish descent
Fellows of the Royal Society of Canada